In nautical parlance, the draft or draught of a sail is a degree of curvature in a horizontal cross-section.  Any sail experiences a force from the prevailing wind just because it impedes the air's passage.  A sail with draft also functions as an airfoil when set at an angle slightly greater than the angle of the wind, producing lift which then propels.

The word "belly" is also used in reference to the draft of a sail (i.e. "More belly in the main sail.").

See also
Forces on sails
Sail components

References

Nautical terminology